The M1 Singapore Fringe Festival is an annual fringe theatre festival in Singapore. In additional to theatrical performances, it hosts art installations, live music, and a forum. It is organised by The Necessary Stage, a non-profit theatre company.

The tenth M1 Singapore Fringe Festival took place in 2014. It had a higher attendance than any previous M1 festival. It was after this festival that The Necessary Stage instituted a policy of appointing a new artistic director every two years. The company intends the two-year tenure to give each director time to realise a vision for the festival, while building relationships with artists and curators.

Themes
The festival occurs each January with a different theme.
 2014 - Art and the People
 2015 - Art & Loss
 2016 - Art & the Animal
 2021 -  Quiet Riot

References

External links
 

21st-century theatre
Festivals in Singapore
Fringe festivals
Theatre in Singapore